William Purcell (30 August 1961 – 14 August 2019) was an Irish hurler who played as a left corner-forward for the Kilkenny senior teams.

Born in Johnstown, County Kilkenny, Purcell first arrived on the inter-county scene at the age of seventeen when he first linked up with the Kilkenny minor team, before later joining the under-21 side. He made his senior debut during the 1982 championship. Purcell enjoyed a brief inter-county career, winning one Leinster medal on the field of play. He also won two All-Ireland medals as a non-playing substitute.

At club level Purcell played with Fenians.

Honours

Team

Kilkenny
All-Ireland Senior Hurling Championship (2): 1982 (sub), 1983 (sub)
Leinster Senior Hurling Championship (2): 1982, 1983 (sub)
National Hurling League (2): 1981-82 (sub), 1982-83 (sub)
Leinster Under-21 Hurling Championship (3): 1980, 1981, 1982
Leinster Minor Hurling Championship (2): 1978, 1979

References

1961 births
Living people
Fenians hurlers
Kilkenny inter-county hurlers